Apisa Air Cargo  was a cargo/freight airline based in Peru that began operations in 1985 and ceased flying in 1997.

Company history

Apisa Air Cargo began operating using Douglas DC-8-54F aircraft transporting meat to Lima from Barranquilla and Asunción.  In 1989 a Douglas DC-8-33F was acquired for the Lima-Iquitos-Lima route and the Lima-Puerto Maldonado-Lima route.  This DC-8-33F had a hard landing at Iquitos during bad weather and the aircraft suffered about 80% damage and had to be written off.

Due to the loss of the DC-8, Apisa acquired a Boeing 707-320C from Million Air of Florida and with that aircraft it got a provisional permit to operate a cargo route Lima-Miami-Lima transporting mostly cattle and textiles.  Also, flights from Lima to Toronto began on a charter basis using a Boeing 707-338C.  But due to pressure from other Peruvian airlines, the permit to operate those routes was cancelled.

Apisa tried to keep operations going by forming a partnership with KLM and Iberia to transfer cargo, but the end came in 1997 when the permits to operate were revoked by the Peruvian government.

Fleet details

1 – Douglas DC-8-33F
1 – Douglas DC-8-54F
1 – Boeing 707-320C
1 – Boeing 707-338C

External links
Data
Picture of the DC-8-33F at Iquitos

References

Defunct airlines of Peru
Airlines established in 1985
Airlines disestablished in 1997
1985 establishments in Peru